The State of Siege is the fourth play by Albert Camus.

Written in 1948, The State of Siege—the original sense is closer to state of emergency—is a play in three acts presenting the arrival of plague, personified by a young opportunist, in sleepy Cadiz and the subsequent creation of a totalitarian regime through the manipulation of fear. In a piece written in 1948, in reply to criticisms from Gabriel Marcel, Camus defended his decision to set the play in Spain, and not in Eastern Europe, citing the ongoing oppression in Spain, France's collusion in it, and the Catholic Church's abandonment of Spanish Christians. 

The piece was first performed in October 1948, and was initially received poorly by critics and public, who had eagerly awaited the work, but expected a dramatisation of Camus's novel The Plague. While the two share a common background, the treatments are entirely different in tone. Although Camus himself was pleased with the work, critics remained unimpressed.

The State of Siege has remained almost constantly in print in French, and since 1958 in an English translation by Stuart Gilbert—in Caligula and Three Other Plays—with a foreword by Camus.

References

External links
 Article on Camus dealing with his plays

1948 plays
Plays by Albert Camus
1951 books
Books by Albert Camus
Books about revolutions
Books about totalitarianism
Éditions Gallimard books